Achille Castiglioni (16 February 1918 – 2 December 2002) was an Italian architect and designer of furniture, lighting, radiograms and other objects. As a professor of design, he advised his students "If you are not curious, forget it. If you are not interested in others, what they do and how they act, then being a designer is not the right job for you."

Early life and education 
Castiglioni was born on 16 February 1918 in Milan, in Lombardy in northern Italy. He was the third son of the sculptor Giannino Castiglioni and his wife Livia Bolla. His elder brothers Livio and Pier Giacomo were both architects.

Castiglioni studied classics at the Liceo Classico Giuseppe Parini in Milan, but switched to study the arts at the Liceo artistico di Brera. In 1937 he enrolled in the faculty of architecture of the Politecnico di Milano. When the Second World War broke out, he became an officer in the artillery and was stationed on the Greek front and later in Sicily. He returned to Milan before the Allied invasion of Sicily of 1943. In March 1944 he graduated from the Politecnico.

Work and career 
Following the war, Castiglioni returned to Milan and joined the architectural design practice that his brothers Livio and Pier Giacomo had started with Luigi Caccia Dominioni in 1938.

Livio Castiglioni left the practice in 1952. From then until Pier Giacomo died in 1968, he and Achille worked as a team; their designs are not attributable to either one of them. Together, the brothers created a number of works that explored Marcel Duchamp's concept of the "ready-made" by incorporating and repurposing existing objects into new designs. After the death of Pier Giacomo, Castiglioni worked alone. 

Together with Pier Giacomo, in 1957 he designed "Sella" and "Mezzadro" stools for Zanotta, as well as the "Cubo" couch for Arflex. In 1959, they began working with Kartell, designing lighting and furniture, including a collection of tables and stools called "Rochetto". Also for Flos, in 1962 they designed both the "Toio" lamp, assembled from "ready-made" surplus hardware, and the "Arco" lamp, which consists of a long arched stainless-steel cantilevered support, an adjustable shade made of perforated spun aluminium, and a heavy marble base. These projects were followed in 1964 by the "Splüghen Braü" pendant light, and the "RR 126" radiogram for Brionvega.

From 1969 he taught architectural and design subjects, first at the Politecnico di Torino, and then, from 1980 when he became an ordinario or full professor, at the Politecnico di Milano.

Achille Castiglioni died in Milan in 2002.

Legacy 
Throughout his lifetime, Castiglioni received many awards and distinctions for his designs, including eight Compasso d'Oro awards, as well as the Compasso d'Oro Career Award "for having raised design to the highest values of culture through his irreplaceable experience." His designs are held in museum collections around the world and several books have been published about his life and work.

In 1997, the Museum of Modern Art (MoMA) in New York staged a retrospective of his life and work titled: "Achille Castiglioni: Design!". The exhibition was curated by Paola Antonelli, who also wrote the catalogue.

In 2014 the city of Milan named a street after the three Castiglioni brothers (Via Fratelli Castiglioni).

Archives and collections 
The Studio Museum of the Achille Castiglioni foundation in Milan holds archival records of 191 architectural projects, 484 installation projects and 290 industrial design projects. A total of c. 11,500 technical drawings and freehand sketches is complemented by 130 plastic models, boxes and drawers containing photographs, slides, glass plates and negatives, videocassettes, DVDs, audio cassettes, extracts from magazines, books, catalogues, and objects collected by Achille Castiglioni.

Additional Achille and Pier Giacomo Castiglioni works and archives are held by the University of Parma.

Museums which hold Castiglioni's works in their collections include the Museum of Modern Art (MoMA) in New York, Victoria and Albert Museum (V&A) in London, Kunstgewerbe Museum in Zurich, Staatliches Museum für angewandte Kunst in Munich, Design Museum in Prato, Israel Museum in Jerusalem, Denver Art Museum, Vitra Design Museum in Weil am Rhein, Angewandte Kunst Museum in Hamburg and Cologne, and the Pompidou Centre in Paris.

Awards and honours 
 1947 Milan Triennale Bronze Medal
 1951 Milan Triennale Grand Prix
 1954 Milan Triennale Grand Prix
 1955 Compasso d'oro Award, Luminator lamp (with Pier Giacomo Castiglioni)
 1957 Milan Triennale Gold Medal
 1957 Milan Triennale Silver Medal
 1960 Compasso d'oro Award, T12 Palini chair (with Pier Giacomo Castiglioni and Luigi Caccia Dominioni)
 1960 Milan Triennale Gold Medal
 1962 Compasso d'oro Award, l la caffè Pitagora (with Pier Giacomo Castiglioni)
 1963 Milan Triennale Silver Medal
 1964 Compasso d'oro Award, Spinamatic beer dispenser (with Pier Giacomo Castiglioni)
 1967 Compasso d'oro Award, Phoebus headset for simultaneous translations (with Pier Giacomo Castiglioni)
 1979 Compasso d'oro Award, Parentesi lamp
 1979 Compasso d'oro Award, Omsa TR15 hospital bed (with Giancarlo Pozzi and Ernesto Zerbi)     
 1984 Compasso d'oro Award, Dry cutlery
 1985 Honorary Member of the Advisory Committee, ArtCenter College of Design, Pasadena, California
 1986 Honorary Member, Royal Designers for Industry of the British Royal Society of Arts
 1987 Honorary Degree, Royal College of Art in London, UK
 1989 Compasso d'Oro Career Award
 1993 Annual Award, Chartered Society of Designers in London, UK
 1994 Spring of Design Award, Department of Culture, Catalonia, Spain
 1995 Art sur Table Prize, Conseil National des Art Culinaire, Paris, France
 1996 IF Design Award from the International Forum Design, Hannover, Germany
 1996 Longevity (Langlebigkeit) Award from the Design Center in Stuttgart, Germany
 1999 Domus/INARCH, Lifetime Achievement Award, Milan, Italy
 1999 "Targa d'Oro" Unione Italiana per il Disegno (UID), Faculty of Architecture, University of Genova, Italy
 1999 First place in the Competition "Supports for the Environment" organized by Enel, with the Michele De Lucchi
 2001 Honorary Degree in Industrial Design, Milan Polytechnic University (Politecnico di Milano), Italy

Partial list of works

Architecture 
 1952-1953 Torre del Palazzo della Permanente, Milan (with Pier Giacomo Castiglioni)
 1956 Church of San Gabriele Arcangelo in Mater Dei, Milan (with Pier Giacomo Castiglioni)
 1958 Chamber of Commerce, Industry, and Agriculture, Milan (with Pier Giacomo Castiglioni)
 1960 Splüghen Braü brewery, Milan (with Pier Giacomo Castiglioni)
 1968 Omega Shop, Piazza Duomo, Milan (with Pier Giacomo Castiglioni)
 1969 Casa Castiglioni, Milan

Exhibition and interior design 
 1954 Industrial Design Pavilion, Palazzo dell'Arte Bernocchi, X Triennale, Milan (with Pier Giacomo Castiglioni)
 1957 "Colour and Form in the Modern Home" exhibit, Villa Olmo Como, Italy (with Pier Giacomo Castiglioni)
 1963 "Vie d'acqua da Milano al mare", Palazzo Reale, Milan (with Pier Giacomo Castiglioni)
 1965 "La casa abitata", Palazzo Strozzi, Florence (with Pier Giacomo Castiglioni)
 1984 "Achille Castiglioni", Austrian Museum für Angewandte Kunst, Vienna
 1988 "Le città del mondo e il futuro delle metropoli", XVII Triennale, Palazzo dell'arte, Milan
 1995 "A la Castiglioni", Centre d'Art Santa Monica, Barcellona

Industrial, product, lighting, and furniture design 

 1956 Spalter vacuum cleaner for R.E.M. (with Pier Giacomo Castiglioni)
 1957 Saliscendi pendant lamp for Stilnovo (with Pier Giacomo Castiglioni)
 1957 Sella stool for Zanotta (with Pier Giacomo Castiglioni) (pictured)
 1957 Mezzadro stool for Zanotta (with Pier Giacomo Castiglioni) (pictured)
 1957 Cubo couch and armchair collection for Arflex, and subsequently Meritalia (with Pier Giacomo Castiglioni)
 1959 Lierna chair for Cassina e Gavina, and subsequently reissued in 2014 by the Fondazione Castiglioni (with Pier Giacomo Castiglioni)
 1959 Dolce cutlery for Reed & Barton, and subsequently reissued as Grand Prix in 1996 by Alessi (with Pier Giacomo Castiglioni)
 1960 Sanluca lounge chair for Gavina, and subsequently Knoll, Bernini, then Poltrona Frau (with Pier Giacomo Castiglioni)
 1960 Taraxacum chandelier for Heisenkeil, and subsequently Flos (with Pier Giacomo Castiglioni)
 1962 Gatto Gatto Piccolo, table lamps for Heisenkeil, and subsequently Flos (with Pier Giacomo Castiglioni)
 1962 Sleek serving spoons for Kraft and Alessi, (with Pier Giacomo Castiglioni)
 1962 Toio floor lamp Flos, (with Pier Giacomo Castiglioni)
 1962 Taccia table lamp Flos, (with Pier Giacomo Castiglioni)
 1962 Arco floor lamp for Flos (with Pier Giacomo Castiglioni)
 1964 Splüghen Braü pendant light for Flos (with Pier Giacomo Castiglioni)
 1964 RR 126 radiogram for Brionvega (with Pier Giacomo Castiglioni) (pictured)
 1965 Orseggi glasses, carafe, and decanter for Arnolfo di Cambio e Alessi (with Pier Giacomo Castiglioni)
 1965 Firenze wall clock for Lorenz e Alessi (with Pier Giacomo Castiglioni)
 1965 Tric, folding chair for BBB (with Pier Giacomo Castiglioni)
 1966 Allunaggio chair for Zanotta (with Pier Giacomo Castiglioni)
 1967 Snoopy table lamp for Flos (with Pier Giacomo Castiglioni)
 1968 Interruttore Rompitratta electric switch for VLM (with Pier Giacomo Castiglioni)
 1970 Primate chair for Zanotta
 1970 Parentesi suspension light for Flos
 1971 Spirale ashtray for Alessi
 1972 Lampadina table lamp for Flos
 1972 Noce table and wall lamp for Flos
 1975 Aoy table lamp for Flos
 1976 Bibip floor lamp for Flos
 1977 Cumano tripod table for Zanotta
 1978 Frisbi suspention lamp Flos
 1979 Ginevra folding chair BBB
 1980 Gibigiana table lamp for Flos
 1980 Acetoliera cruet set for Rossi & Arcandi (and later for Alessi from 1984)
 1982 Dry silverware for Alessi
 1982 Moni lamp for Flos
 1982 Giovi lamp for Flos
 1983 Paro Glassware for Danese
 1983 Ovio Glasses and Caraffe for Danese
 1984 Stylos, floor lamp for Flos
 1987 Basello small table
 1988 Taraxacum88 floor lamp for Flos
 1989 Record wristwatch for Alessi (pictured)
 1990 Joy furniture for Zanotta
 1992 Brera lamp for Flos
 1995 Fruttiera scolatoio fruit bowl for Alessi
 1995 Tavolo 95 table for De Padova
 1995 Mate,Supremate, and Minimate, vases for De Padova
 1996 Scrittarello writing desk for De Padova
 1996 Fucsia lighting collection for Flos
 1997 Bavero tableware for Alessi
 1998 Diabolo lamp for Flos
 2001 CENTO3 writing instruments, posthumously produced by EGO.M (with Gianfranco Cavaglià)

Publications 

 Ferrari, P., Achille Castiglioni, Electa, Milan, 1984. . .
 Sparke, P. Design in Italy: 1870 to the present, Abbeville Press, New York, 1988. . .
 Antonelli, P., Guernaccia, S., Achille Castiglioni, Edizioni Corraini, Mantova, 2000. . .
 Dardi, D., Achille Castiglioni, Testo & Immagine, Torino, 2001
 Polano, S., Achille Castiglioni tutte le opere 1938-2000, Electa, Milano, 2001
 Cavaglia, G., Di Achille Castiglioni, Edizioni Corraini, Mantova, 2006
 Taki, Y., Design as a Quest for Freedom, Axis, 2007
 Vercelloni, M., Achille e Pier Giacomo Castiglioni, 24 Ore Cultura, Milano, 2011
 Bettinelli, E., La voce del Maestro. Achille Castiglioni, Edizioni Corraini, Mantova 2014. . . 
 
 Dizionario enciclopedico di architettura e urbanistica, Istituto Editoriale Romano, Roma, 1969, vol. III, 510
 MacMillan Encyclopedia of Architects, The Free Press, New York, 1982, 392
 Dizionario dell'architettura del XX secolo, a cura di C. OLMO, Allemandi, Torino, 2000, 34-36
 Gli archivi di architettura in Lombardia. Censimento delle fonti, a cura di G.L. CIAGA', CASVA - Centro di Alti Studi sulle Arti Visive, con la collaborazione della Soprintendenza archivistica della Lombardia e del Politecnico di Milano, Milano, 2003., 56
 Gli archivi di architettura design e grafica in Lombardia. Censimento delle fonti, a cura di G. L. CIAGA', CASVA - Centro di Alti Studi sulle Arti Visive (Quaderni del CASVA, 11), con la collaborazione della Soprintendenza archivistica della Lombardia e del Politecnico di Milano, Milano, 2012

References

External links

 
 Foundation Achille Castiglinoi
 Achille Castiglioni speech (transcription, in Italian) International Design Conference, Aspen, Colorado (1989)
 "Achille e Pier Giacomo Castiglioni", RAI Television documentary, Part One (in Italian)
 "Achille e Pier Giacomo Castiglioni", RAI Television documentary, Part Two (in Italian)
 "The world according to Castiglioni", Domus magazine
 "100 Years of Castiglioni: His Geologist Daughter Digs into the Designer's Layered Legacy"
 Arco Lamp assembly, short film (narration in French) 
 "Achille Castiglioni on Taraxacum 88", short documentary film (in Italian) 

1918 births
2002 deaths
Polytechnic University of Milan alumni
Academic staff of the Polytechnic University of Milan
Royal Designers for Industry
Architects from Milan
Italian furniture designers
Italian industrial designers
Italian designers
Product designers
Lighting designers
Industrial design
Designers
Compasso d'Oro Award recipients